Cool Math Games (branded as Coolmath Games) is an online web portal that hosts HTML and Flash web browser games targeted at children and young adults. Cool Math Games is operated by Coolmath LLC and first went online in 1997 with the slogan: "Where logic & thinking meets fun & games.". The site maintains a policy that it will only host games that the operators believe are non-violent and educational and is partnered with coolmath.com and coolmath4kids.com.

In November 2019, Popular Mechanics listed Cool Math Games as one of its "50 most important websites" since the internet was created.

In September 2022, Coolmath Coding was launched to teach kids how to code in Roblox and Minecraft.

History

Shutdown hoax
Rumors began spreading in mid-2019 that Cool Math Games was to shut down in 2020 due to the discontinuation of Adobe Flash Player. In light of these rumors, a petition was created on Change.org to stop it from shutting down and reached over 100,000 signatures. However, Cool Math Games confirmed that it would not be shutting down and was focusing on getting new HTML5 games and converting old Flash games to HTML5 after Adobe Flash reached its end-of-life in 2020. The website opted to use emulation technologies like Ruffle to continue using and viewing legacy flash content.

Impact of the COVID-19 pandemic
During the COVID-19 pandemic, Cool Math Games' popularity has drastically increased, being played by students whilst in lockdown and self-isolating. Cool Math Games' Alexa ranking went up drastically.

Reception
Coolmath Games has received generally positive reception. The Daily Dot called the website's library of content “impressive” in a run-down of the best games on the site.

References

Footnotes

External links

Browser-based game websites
Internet properties established in 1997
2010s fads and trends
2020s fads and trends